Walter Henry "Hy" Heath (July 9, 1890 – April 3, 1965) was an American entertainer, songwriter, composer and writer. Born in Oakville, Tennessee, he received his education in public schools and then became a comedian in musical comedy, vaudeville, minstrel and burlesque shows. 

His chief musical collaborators included Johnny Lange and Fred Rose. His most successful composition was "Mule Train" which earned him an Academy Award nomination (it was featured in the 1950 film Singing Guns).

Another of his many popular songs which he composed was "The Hills of Utah" which was sung by Ken Curtis in the Hollywood western Stallion Canyon starring Ken Curtis and Carolina Cotton.

References

1890 births
1965 deaths
people from Memphis, Tennessee
Vaudeville performers
American composers
20th-century American comedians